The Devil's Trail is a 1919 American silent drama film that is set in the woods of the Pacific Northwest. It was directed by Stuart Paton and stars Betty Compson. It is not known whether the film currently survives.

Plot
As described in a film magazine, Dibec (Malatesta), a whiskey smuggler who trades liquor to the Indians for blankets and furs, is being pursued by the Royal Northwest Mounted Police. Dubec stops at the post where Mrs. Delisle, wife of Sergeant Delisle, is alone with her daughter Nonette and her baby sister Julie. Dubec kills Mrs. Delisle and abducts Nonette. Twelve years later, Julie (Compson) is celebrating her 16th birthday. The men of the Royal Mounted attend this function, and while the dinner is in progress, Sergeant MacNair arrives. He at once falls in love with Julie, and she with him, and this love persists even though MacNair is to succeed Julie's father as commander of the post. The post is located at Chino Landing, and Sergeant Delisle has been unable to curb the lawless element brought by the gold rush. After twelve years Dubec has returned from the gold camp and is accompanied by Nonette. She is now a woman of the dance halls, and at first she succeeds in keeping her identity secret from her father. But when Delisle's life is endangered by the lawless element and Julie is kidnapped by Dubec, Nonette reveals her secret. While MacNair, who has also been taken prisoner, fights to save Julie, Nonette brings her father and others to the scene. Dubec is captured and there is a happy reunion.

Cast
Betty Compson as Julie Delisle 
George Larkin as Sergeant MacNair
William Quinn as 'Dutch' Vogel
Fred Malatesta as Dubec
Claire Du Brey as Dubec's Wife
H. C. Carpenter
Joseph J. Franz
Howard Crampton
Robert F. McGowan

unbilled
Alberta Franklin

Production
The Devil's Trail during production had the working title of Rose of the Border, which would have reflected the name of Compson's role, then named Rose.

References

External links

Lantern slide

1919 films
American silent feature films
Lost American films
Films directed by Stuart Paton
American black-and-white films
1919 drama films
World Film Company films
Silent American drama films
1919 lost films
Lost drama films
1910s American films